DC-SIGN (Dendritic Cell-Specific Intercellular adhesion molecule-3-Grabbing Non-integrin) also known as CD209 (Cluster of Differentiation 209) is a protein which in humans is encoded by the CD209 gene.

DC-SIGN is a C-type lectin receptor present on the surface of both macrophages and dendritic cells. DC-SIGN on macrophages recognises and binds with high affinity to high-mannose type N-glycans, a class of PAMPs (pathogen associated molecular patterns) commonly found on viruses, bacteria and fungi. This binding interaction activates phagocytosis. On myeloid and pre-plasmacytoid dendritic cells DC-SIGN mediates dendritic cell rolling interactions with blood endothelium and activation of CD4+ T cells, as well as recognition of pathogen haptens.

Function 

DC-SIGN is a C-type lectin and has a high affinity for the ICAM3 molecule. It binds various microorganisms by recognizing high-mannose-containing glycoproteins on their surface, and can function as a co-receptor for several viruses such as HIV and Hepatitis C. Binding to DC-SIGN can promote HIV and Hepatitis C virus to infect target cells (T-cells and hepatocytes, respectively).

Besides functioning as an adhesion molecule, recent studies have also shown that DC-SIGN can initiate innate immunity by modulating toll-like receptors, though the detailed mechanism is not yet known. DC-SIGN together with other C-type lectins is involved in recognition of tumors by dendritic cells. DC-SIGN is also a potential engineering target for dendritic cell based cancer vaccine.

Role in HIV infection 

This molecule is involved in the initial stages of the human immunodeficiency virus infection, as the HIV gp120 molecule causes co-internalization of the DC-SIGN molecule and HIV virus particle (virion).  The dendritic cell then migrates to the cognate lymphoid organ, whereupon recycling of the DC-SIGN/HIV virion complex to the cell periphery facilitates HIV infection of CD4+ T cells by interaction between DC-SIGN and ICAM-3.

Role in Ebola Virus infection/inhibition 
Different studies have demonstrated that the ebola virus infection process starts when the virus reaches the cellular DC-SIGN receptor to infect the dendritic cells (of the immune system). In 2015 European researchers designed a “giant” molecule formed by thirteen fullerenes covered by carbohydrates which, by blocking DC-SIGN receptor, are able to inhibit the cell infection by an artificial ebola virus model. These antiviral molecules decorated with specific carbohydrates (sugars) present affinity by the receptor used as an entry point to infect the cell and act blocking it, thus inhibiting the infection in a sub-nanomolar range.

Gene family 

DC-SIGN/CD209 is an animal "C-lectin", a large and diverse family of proteins found in both prokaryotes and eukaryotes most of which are functional lectins, meaning they bind carbohydrate ligands, and whose ligand-binding affinity requires calcium (hence "C-lectin").   Among the animal C-lectins, a subfamily known as the ASGR (asialoglycoprotein receptors) group contains several sub-sub-families, many of which are important to innate immunity.

A cluster of genes in both humans and mice contains three related members of the "DC Receptor" class, so named because of their homology to DC-SIGN. Of these, CD23 is, however, not expressed on dendritic cells but is a characteristic surface molecule of B lymphocytes, and LSectin (CLEC4G) is expressed on the sinusoidal endothelium of the liver.  The third gene group consists of multiple paralogues of CD209. Thus, both primates and mice have multiple paralogues of CD209 more closely related to each other within the species than to their orthologous counterparts in the other species.  Higher primates have at least three DC-SIGN genes, DC-SIGN, DC-SIGNL1 and DC-SIGNL2, although not all three are present in every species; DC-SIGNL2 has not been detected in humans.   Eight paralogous of DC-SIGN have been reported in the laboratory mouse strain C57BL/6; these go by the names DC-SIGN, DC-SIGNR2...DC-SIGNR8. DC-SIGNR6 is a pseudogene. The genes labeled "DC-SIGN" in the human and mouse are thus not unique orthologues, although they resemble each other functionally and by being expressed on dendritic cells. Other members of the mouse CD209 gene group are differentially expressed on different cell types.  For example, DC-SIGNR1 is expressed largely on macrophages in the marginal zones of the spleen and in the medulla of lymph nodes.

References

Further reading

External links 
 

Receptors
Clusters of differentiation
C-type lectins